Birth of a New Day  is the second studio album by English-American electronic music duo of dreampunk producers Hong Kong Express (also known as HKE) and Telepath (stylized as  テレパシー能力者), both collaborating under the alias 2814, released on January 21, 2015, by HKE's record label Dream Catalogue. With the popularity of vaporwave in the early to mid-2010s, the duo experimented with the genre by not using any form of samples to compose the album, thus becoming notable for being one of the first vaporwave releases not to include such production techniques. 2814 stated that they wanted it to "have a strong sense of place"; its themes reflect the dark worldviews of HKE.

Birth of a New Day was the breakthrough album of Dream Catalogue and also the first physical release of the label; it is one of the most popular releases associated with the vaporwave genre, as well as one of the most positively received. Described as a "cult classic" by an AllMusic editor and as a catalyst of the dreampunk genre by the duo, it became the best-selling album of the genre on the music website Bandcamp.

Background
Birth of a New Day was produced by vaporwave producers Hong Kong Express (also known as HKE) and  Telepath (stylized as  テレパシー能力者), both collaborating under the alias 2814. Although receiving positive reception, their previous self-titled debut album had gained small recognition on the internet, described by the duo as "a minor hit at the time". This was not the first time HKE and Telepath had collaborated; on September 1, 2015, Fragmented Memories was released under the alias 断片化された友人 (Fragmented Friends), which also included other vaporwave producers such as Cat System Corp., Cvltvre, bodyline and other artists.

Prior to the album's release, Telepath established in the vaporwave community as one of the most prominent figures in the scene, being considered as the best producer of the genre by HKE himself. On November 25, 2014, his album アンドロメダ (Andromeda) was released, being described by some commentators as one of the most "ethereal, peaceful" albums of all time.

On January 10, 2015, eleven days before Birth of a New Day's release, HKE had released HK, one of his first albums; in an interview with Bandcamp, he compares both albums, noting that although there are similarities between the two, HK is, in his opinion, much more minimal. While believing that his solo album presents a similar concept and atmosphere to the listener, he stated that it is in a much more subtle way than Birth of a New Day, although later pointing that this makes HK "maybe a bit more melancholic". In this interview, he also noted how the themes of Birth of a New Day reflect his worldviews, viewing the world as a "cold dream" constructed by society.

Three months before the release of Birth of a New Day, and before 2814 or HK were released, HKE stated in an RBMA interview that the most important thing a vaporwave producer should do is "something cinematic in effect." He further points out that in his solo albums, he tries to depict a feeling of "love and loneliness in the big city." In an interview with NeonVice, a website for "everything retro, synthwave, vaporwave, & aesthetic", HKE states that the album is the "perfect follow up" to 2814's debut album; he notes that he and Telepath feel they "have topped the first" and were excited to release the album since finishing the mastering process in December 2014. HKE further points out that the album would still present the futuristic ambiance and atmosphere of their first album, but with "just a bit more of a refined and concise edge to it."

Musical style, writing, and composition
HKE stated that in Birth of a New Day, he and Telepath wanted the album to "have a strong sense of place", arguing that they were trying to create a futuristic dream and world "without being too direct about where that is." It is unclear whether the album depicts an utopia or a dystopia; the duo often presents the album as a "distant neon utopia", but HKE frequently states in interviews that his obscure worldviews have played a major role in the album's production. HKE affirmed in another interview that he likes to let the listener make up their own interpretation of his albums' themes.

All but the last two tracks are short, 5–20 second melodies looped over for 5–9 minutes each, resembling the composition of William Basinski's The Disintegration Loops. The last two tracks, "Telepathy" and "Birth of a New Day", mainly feature the ambient noise of the city and are much longer than the other tracks, having 10-minute and 13-minute lengths respectively. The album is notable for being a vaporwave release that presents dialogue (although the dialogue is only featured two times in the album's runtime).

In an interview with the Rolling Stone magazine, in November 2015, HKE demonstrates how much his worldviews have influenced the album; although not consuming any type of drugs, various aspects of what "drives me [HKE] spiritually in life" would most likely be considered somber by most people, also noticing his frequent occurrences of vivid dreams, nightmares, sleep paralysis and hallucinations since young age. He relates that he sits in a dark room lit by a red light almost every night and "I [HKE] just take inspiration from the world around me." HKE also states that he often reads about philosophy, history, religion, science, and related themes, pointing out that he has developed his theories on music being a type of "objective divine language of the universe" that he has the desire to write a book on in the future; he describes his music as "all about understanding the human condition." In the album's Bandcamp page, the duo presented the album's concept, atmosphere, and ambiance:

Production
Differently from most popular vaporwave releases at the time, Birth of a New Day was one of the first albums of the genre not to include sampling as a production technique: in a Rolling Stone interview, HKE expressed his and Telepath's desire to produce a vaporwave album that could not be classified as plunderphonics, stating that they wanted to show how the vaporwave "vibe" could be made in an original way, rather than relying on muzak and slowed-down jazz samples most people at the time used to produce vaporwave. He pointed out that while he thought the idea of producing music with samples was "cool", he has always been more "enamored" by the thematic concepts of the genre, focusing on the surreal futurismo and on "painting a narrative through music." In an early 2015 interview with the website NeonVice, when asked about what he thinks should change in the vaporwave genre, HKE says although he dislikes to be someone who "dictates to people what they should and shouldn't do with their music," he also dislikes the notion that the genre is all about slowed-down reverberated samples, "badly photoshopped" roman busts, retro video game consoles and meaningless kanji.

In an interview with C Monster, a writer from the website Tiny Mix Tapes, HKE described the production process for the 2814 alias in detail, stating that either Telepath or him would start producing a track, "flesh out" ideas between the two, and then send it over the other. Then they'd "send it back and forth" until the track was fully constructed and they were satisfied with it, ending up with one of them finishing the mastering process. Then they'd "put it in the pile ready for album consideration." HKE praises this form of musical collaboration, stating that this process is generally "as 50/50 as you can get with collaborative work." He further stated that although a specific track's style might suggest who was the one with most impact on the production of that specific track, the production process is overall very balanced. He noted that producing music with Telepath was one of the greatest collaborating experiences he'd ever had, to the point where he was "so excited" after finishing the mastering process of a track for a new release that he had dropped his new laptop on the ground and broke the screen.

Artwork and packaging
Birth of a New Day features a default and an animated version of the artwork made by Brazilian art designer Gustavo Torres, known as Kidmograph, a Tumblr user and .gif producer who was previously well known in social media for producing other vaporwave art and for working with other mainstream artists. The artwork features the panoramic view of a futuristic cyberpunk city along with various signs written in Japanese: three of those representing the stylized name of the album, 新しい日の誕生, and two of those representing the stylized name of the duo behind the album, ２８１４. HKE stated that the number 2814 might be the number on the door of a hotel room in the year 2084, rather than the year"It's open to interpretation." The animated version includes the silhouette of a person looking through a window and animated rain drops.

The duo launched a campaign in November 2015 via Indiegogo in order to press the album on vinyl: 214 backers surpassed its goal within a month and it ended up 161% funded. They were able to press 1000 copies of 2xLP 180g vinyl and, with the help of Bleep/Warp, ship them out to buyers worldwide. Backers of the campaign were also able to choose a perk that included a reissue of the original cassette release, limited to 50 copies. Both the cassette and vinyl releases included a bonus track, titled Aftermath. Finally, the album was repressed on cassette in 2016 by the Not Not Fun Records label, limited to 80 copies.

Release, promotion, and marketing
Birth of a New Day was first released by HKE's label Dream Catalogue on January 21, 2015. A limited-edition batch of 50 CD-Rs was released along with the digital release of the album, being the first physical release of the label; in an interview with NeonVice, HKE states that although Dream Catalogue had previously released cassettes, they were in conjunction with smaller labels who worked on the physical side, while Dream Catalogue worked on the digital side. He further states that he always likes to do things differently with Dream Catalogue than what is expected, and instead of physically releasing the album in a cassette which was "the trend", he decided to introduce the CD format to vaporwave. He stated that CDs were something he always cherished growing up as "an avid music fan" when being a teenager, and that he still has a strong connection to the format (though still releasing cassettes). He further pointed out that releasing his music on CD is perhaps something romantic, and maybe the realization of a childhood dream of his. On August 31, 2019, Dream Catalogue repressed all 2814 albums on vinyl and released customized Birth of a New Day t-shirts, which were the first official shirts of the duo.

The music video for "Distant Lovers" debuted on February 27, 2016, on Dream Catalogue's official YouTube channel, serving as a demo of the track. Created by a now deleted YouTube user named NVLLVS, the video shows multiple ambiances of GTA V, apparently modified. The "Recovery" music video, now featuring the track in full, premiered on Dream Catalogue's channel on August 20, 2016, described as "a dreamy music video". Filmed by Alex Zou, David Koh and Autumn Lew, photography directors from Beijing/Tokyo, an Asian woman lying in a bed and getting up seen, followed by short clips of the same woman in a hurry to take the subway. When entering she sits, closes her eyes and sleeps before the video cuts out to other people in the subway. After sleeping, the apparently confused woman gets out of the subway and goes home, followed by a clip of her watching the panoramic view of the city at sunset through the window. Published by radioclub.jp and directed by Anise Mariko, the video, being the 5th most watched upload of the Dream Catalogue channel, has gained positive reception from the public, being described as "absolutely marvelous" by some commentators.

Critical reception

Upon release, Birth of a New Day was received positively by professional critics. The Rolling Stone magazine has reacted positively to the album, saying that the opening track is "a dreamy, gorgeous cascade of deep drone, cascading piano and distant sirens." Not Not Fun boss Britt Brown has described the album as "amazing cyberfuture ambient vaporwave" to the Vice magazine. When reviewing the best cassette releases of August 2015, Tristan Bath from The Quietus said that the album is one of the most powerful depictions of "ambient, rain soaked urban beauty" to have come out in years. Noting the Blade Runner inspiration and comparing the album to DJ Shadow's Endtroducing....., Bath has also praised the combination of Telepath's and HKE's musical styles, which was "perfect", arguing that the album offers "years of peaceful healing to everybody who gives it a listen."

Presenting mixed feelings about the album, the Resident Advisor contributor Andrew Ryce stated that while Birth of a New Day is among the most mature releases on Dream Catalogue, the release still is akin to most other vaporwave albums: "alternately brilliant and sloppy, emotionally resonant at one moment and hollow the next." He said that even though the album does not include any sample-based music, some of the tracks still sound like such. Ryce also affirmed the album still relies on vaporwave clichés such as purple neon and Asian language, which "makes it feel a bit run-of-the-mill." He felt what set Birth of a New Day apart from other vaporwave releases were its "vivid ambient landscapes." Comparing the album to William Basinski's The Disintegration Loops, Ryce also noted how most of the tracks are composed of one single tone each, looped for several minutes. He concluded that the album is "a record with stunning highs and a fair few lows. If nothing else, it's proof that the spirit of vaporwave is alive and well."

C Monster, a writer from the website Tiny Mix Tapes, has had a greatly positive and detailed reaction to the album, describing that in this release, 2814 "swarms within riddled baselines dubbed to the suds circling the shower drain, draining the last bits of filth into a pipe that leads to a different story all together." The writer has also reacted positively about the album's atmosphere and ambience, praising the usage of neon and advertisements which "pairs the citizens to this spectral of light". He creates his own narrative in the review, stating that he hears the citizens "walking down the road to purchase indigestion" through one of the biggest cities of the Earth; "the subway is queasy whilst it's delayed, at a stand-still."

The Igloo Magazine says that Birth of a New Day "isn't an album that begins, it's one you arrive at;" the magazine describes each track in detail and praises the aesthetics of the album, although later stating that doing so does not represent the entirety of the album's "beauty":

Legacy
Birth of a New Day popularized the Dream Catalogue Label. In November 2015, Rolling Stone noted that the album had become "an unparalleled success within a small, passionate pocket of the Internet" and "a staple of the Bandcamp charts"; the release of the album at the Dream Catalogue label, stylized as 新しい日の誕生, is the "all-time best selling dreampunk" release of the website. HKE stated that the album is the definitive release of the label, saying that it "helped define the label, and what the guiding vision of the label should be."

According to Paul Simpson, an AllMusic writer, almost immediately after its release, the album's "dreamy atmospherics and nostalgic melodies struck a chord with listeners, and it became an instant cult classic." After the album's release, the Vice magazine named the duo as "vaporwave superstars", stating that in the scene, 2814 is "as good as it gets." The duo states that Birth of a New Day was one of the most important dreampunk releases as it was a catalyst of the genre and of the record label:

Track listing
All track titles are written in Japanese. English translations are adapted from the 2019 reissue.

Personnel 
Adapted from the 2019 reissue.
HKE – producer
Telepath – producer
Alex Zou – photography director
David Koh – photography director
Autumn Lew – photography director
NVLLVS – music video creator
Anise Mariko – music video director
Gustavo Torres – cover art creator

References

External links

2015 albums
2814 albums
Instrumental albums
Vaporwave albums